Duisburg is a city in the Ruhr metropolitan area of the western German state of North Rhine-Westphalia. Lying on the confluence of the Rhine and the Ruhr rivers in the center of the Rhine-Ruhr Region, Duisburg is the 5th largest city in North Rhine-Westphalia and the 15th-largest city in Germany.

In the Middle Ages, it was a city-state and a member of the Hanseatic League, and later became a major centre of iron, steel, and chemicals industries. For this reason, it was heavily bombed in World War II. Today it boasts the world's largest inland port, with 21 docks and 40 kilometres of wharf.

Status
Duisburg is a city in Germany's Rhineland, the fifth-largest (after Cologne, Düsseldorf, Dortmund and Essen) of the nation's most populous federal state of North Rhine-Westphalia. Its 500,000 inhabitants make it Germany's 15th-largest city. Located at the confluence of the Rhine river and its tributary the Ruhr river, it lies in the west of the Ruhr urban area, Germany's largest, of which it is the third-largest city after Dortmund and Essen. The Ruhr itself lies within the larger Rhine-Ruhr Metropolitan Region, one of Europe's largest conurbations. The city lies on both sides of the Rhine, with the city centre and most boroughs on the river's right bank, and is the only city of the Rhine-Ruhr region lying on both the Rhine and Ruhr rivers. Duisburg is one of the largest cities in the Meuse-Rhenish (closely related to Dutch) dialect area and the largest in the South Guelderish area (north of the Uerdingen Isogloss).

Duisburg has the world's largest inland port, "Duisburg-Ruhrorter Häfen", in Duisburg-Ruhrort. Germany's third-largest and the Rhine-Ruhr region's main airport, Düsseldorf Airport, lies near the city, in Düsseldorf-Lohausen. With 42,747 students, the University of Duisburg-Essen is Germany's ninth-largest university. It has campuses in Essen and Duisburg, and a university hospital in Essen. Duisburg is a result of numerous incorporations of surrounding towns and smaller cities. The city is renowned for its steel industry. All blast furnaces in the Ruhr are now located in Duisburg. In 2000, 49% of all hot metal and 34.4% of all pig iron in Germany were produced here. It also has a large brewery, König. In the early Middle Ages, it was a royal court of the Franks, first mentioned in writing in 883.

Geography 
Duisburg is in the Lowland Rhine area at the confluence of the Rhine and Ruhr and near the outskirts of the Bergisches Land. The city spreads along both sides of these rivers.

Adjacent cities 
The following cities border Duisburg (clockwise starting from the north-east):
Oberhausen, Mülheim an der Ruhr, Ratingen, Düsseldorf, Meerbusch, Krefeld, Moers, Rheinberg, and Dinslaken.

Districts 
Since 1 January 1975, Duisburg has been divided into seven districts or boroughs (Stadtbezirke) from north to south:

 Walsum (51,528)
 Hamborn (71,528)
 Meiderich/Beeck (73,881)
 Homberg/Ruhrort/Baerl (41,153)
 Duisburg-Mitte (center) (105,961)
 Rheinhausen (77,933)
 Duisburg-Süd (73,321)

Climate 
Duisburg has an oceanic climate (Köppen: Cfb).

Politics

Mayor 
The current Mayor of Duisburg is Sören Link of the Social Democratic Party (SPD), who was elected in 2012 and re-elected in 2017.

The most recent mayoral election was held on 24 September 2017, and the results were as follows:

! colspan=2| Candidate
! Party
! Votes
! %
|-
| 
| align=left| Sören Link
| align=left| Social Democratic Party
| 127,793
| 56.7
|-
| 
| align=left| Gerhard Meyer
| align=left| Christian Democratic Union
| 57,815
| 25.7
|-
| 
| align=left| Erkan Kocalar
| align=left| The Left
| 13,306
| 5.9
|-
| 
| align=left| Thomas Wolters
| align=left| Free Democratic Party
| 12,776
| 5.7
|-
| 
| align=left| Melanie Händelkes
| align=left| National Democratic Party
| 7,519
| 3.3
|-
| 
| align=left| Yasar Durmus
| align=left| Independent
| 5,478
| 2.4
|-
! colspan=3| Valid votes
! 224,687
! 98.7
|-
! colspan=3| Invalid votes
! 3,009
! 1.3
|-
! colspan=3| Total
! 227,696
! 100.0
|-
! colspan=3| Electorate/voter turnout
! 365,646
! 62.3
|-
| colspan=5| Source: City of Duisburg
|}

City council 

The Duisburg city council (Duisburger Stadtrat) governs the city alongside the Mayor. The most recent city council election was held on 13 September 2020, and the results were as follows:

! colspan=2| Party
! Votes
! %
! +/-
! Seats
! +/-
|-
| 
| align=left| Social Democratic Party (SPD)
| 43,051
| 30.8
|  10.1
| 32
|  3
|-
| 
| align=left| Christian Democratic Union (CDU)
| 29,966
| 21.5
|  3.3
| 22
|  1
|-
| 
| align=left| Alliance 90/The Greens (Grüne)
| 24,728
| 17.7
|  10.3
| 19
|  13
|-
| 
| align=left| Alternative for Germany (AfD)
| 12,968
| 9.3
|  5.7
| 10
|  7
|-
| 
| align=left| The Left (Die Linke)
| 7,714
| 5.5
|  1.0
| 6
| ±0
|-
| 
| align=left| Free Democratic Party (FDP)
| 4,333
| 3.1
|  0.7
| 3
|  1
|-
| 
| align=left| Young Duisburg (JUDU)
| 4,091
| 2.9
|  0.8
| 3
|  1
|-
| 
| align=left| Human Environment Animal Protection (Tierschutz)
| 2,599
| 1.9
| New
| 2
| New
|-
| 
| align=left| Duisburg Alternative List (DAL)
| 1,709
| 1.2
|  0.1
| 1
| ±0
|-
| 
| align=left| Die PARTEI (PARTEI)
| 1,596
| 1.1
| New
| 1
| New
|-
| 
| align=left| We Shape Duisbug (WGD)
| 1,471
| 1.1
| New
| 1
| New
|-
| 
| align=left| Socially Just Independent (SGU)
| 1,384
| 1.0
|  0.1
| 1
| ±0
|-
| 
| align=left| Solidarity for Duisburg (SfD)
| 958
| 0.7
| New
| 1
| New
|-
| colspan=7 bgcolor=lightgrey| 
|-
| 
| align=left| BIG-Dergah
| 890
| 0.6
| New
| 0
| New
|-
| 
| align=left| Civic Liberals (BL)
| 608
| 0.4
| New
| 0
| New
|-
| 
| align=left| National Democratic Party (NPD)
| 550
| 0.4
|  1.3
| 0
|  1
|-
| 
| align=left| Alliance Duisburg (Allianz)
| 377
| 0.3
| New
| 0
| New
|-
| 
| align=left| Alliance for Duisburg (BfD)
| 290
| 0.2
| New
| 0
| New
|-
| 
| align=left| Independent Gisela Schiffers
| 141
| 0.1
| New
| 0
| New
|-
|-
| 
| align=left| Digital Ecological Social (DOS)
| 83
| 0.1
| New
| 0
| New
|-
| 
| align=left| Independent Marliese Lenz
| 57
| 0.0
| New
| 0
| New
|-
| 
| align=left| Awakening Duisburg (Aufbruch Du)
| 41
| 0.0
| New
| 0
| New
|-
! colspan=2| Valid votes
! 139,605
! 98.9
!
!
!
|-
! colspan=2| Invalid votes
! 1,618
! 1.1
!
!
!
|-
! colspan=2| Total
! 141,223
! 100.0
!
! 102
!  18
|-
! colspan=2| Electorate/voter turnout
! 360,750
! 39.1
!  1.4
!
!
|-
| colspan=7| Source: State Returning Officer
|}

State Landtag 
In the Landtag of North Rhine-Westphalia, Duisburg is divided between three constituencies: 61 Duisburg I (containing Süd district and most of Mitte), 62 Duisburg II (Walsum, Rheinhausen, and most of Homberg/Ruhrort/Baerl), and 63 Duisburg III (Hamborn, Meiderich/Beeck, and parts of Mitte and Homberg/Ruhrort/Baerl). After the 2022 North Rhine-Westphalia state election, all three constituencies were held by the SPD. Duisburg I was represented by Sarah Philipp, Duisburg II by Rainer Bischoff, and Duisburg III by Frank Börner.

Federal parliament 
In the Bundestag, Duisburg is divided between two constituencies: 115 Duisburg I (Rheinhausen, Süd, and Mitte) and 116 Duisburg II (Walsum, Hamborn, Meidereich/Beeck, Homberg/Ruhrort/Baerl). In the 20th Bundestag, both are held by the SPD. Duisburg I is represented by President of the Bundestag Bärbel Bas, and Duisburg II by Mahmut Özdemir.

History 

The first syllable of the name of the city could go back to the Proto-Indo-European root *dʰeus-, meaning something like "wet area" or "flood plain". Duisburg therefore could mean "fortified place in the floodplain". Another interpretation assumes that the name is derived from the Old German "duis" which means "hill". Duisburg could mean something like "castle on the hill". Thus, a place on a hill overlooking the Rhine, that could refer to the area of the present Town Hall. Duisburggau (Diuspurgau) was also the name of the medieval Gau (country subdivision) on the Lower Rhine.

A legend recorded by Johannes Aventinus (fl. 1525) holds that Duisburg (along with Deutz, Cologne, Duisdorf in Bonn, and Doesburg in the Netherlands, all on the Rhine's right bank) was built by the namesake Tuisto, mythical progenitor of Germans, ca. 2395 BC. There is nothing to establish any historical basis for such an early founding of Duisburg, which would have made it among the earliest cities in Europe.

Roman period 
Latest archaeological studies show that the present-day market-place was already in use in the first century. It has been the major central trading place of the city since the 5th century. The city itself was located at the "Hellweg", an important medieval trade route, and at a ford across the Rhine. The Romans already guarded the ford.
 420: The Franks usurp the Roman settlement and recolonize the old part of the town.
 883: The Normans conquer Duisburg and stay for the winter. First historic document mentioning Duisburg.

Middle Ages 
Due to the town's favorable geographic position a palatinate was built and the town was soon granted the royal charter of a free city. Duisburg became a member of the Hanseatic League. Around 1000 the river Rhine moved westward from the city. This put an end to the city's development as a trading town and it soon grew into a quiet rural city.

The productions of cartographer Gerardus Mercator and the foundation of a university in 1655 established the city's renown as "Educated Duisburg" ("Duisburgum Doctum").
1120: construction of the city wall
 1279: "city charter" granted by King Lothar III
 1290 Duisburg becomes part of the County (after 1417 Duchy) of Cleves
 1445 attack by Archbishop-Elector Dietrich II von Moers (de) of Cologne was thwarted
 1566 Johannes Corputius completes his city map of Duisburg.
 1666 Duisburg within the Duchy of Cleves becomes a part of Brandenburg-Prussia

Industrial revolution 

The rise of tobacco and textile industries in the 18th century made Duisburg an industrial center.  Big industrial companies such as iron and steel producing firms (Thyssen and Krupp) influenced the development of the city within the Prussian Rhine Province.
Large housing areas near production sites were being built as workers and their families moved in.
 1823 a district ("Landkreis") Duisburg is established including the cities of Essen and Mülheim an der Ruhr.
 1824 construction of the sulfuric acid factory Fr. W. Curtius; beginning of the industry age in Duisburg.
 1828 Franz Haniel builds a dockyard for steamships
 1846 railway line to Düsseldorf
 1847 railway line via Dortmund to Minden
 1873 Duisburg becomes an independent city borough.
 1904 Birth of the 100,000th resident (Ernst R. Straube)
 1921 French Infantry occupy the city on 8 March to secure war reparation payments incurred during World War I.
 1929 The city of Hamborn and Duisburg are joined together. The new city is given the name of Duisburg-Hamborn.
 1935 Duisburg-Hamborn is renamed Duisburg.
 1938 (November) The Nazis destroy the city's synagogue.

World War II 

A major logistical center in the Ruhr and location of chemical, steel and iron industries, Duisburg was a primary target of Allied bombers. As such, it is considered by some historians to be the single most heavily bombed German city by the Allies during World War II, with industrial areas and residential blocks targeted by Allied incendiary bombs.

On the night of 12–13 June 1941, British bombers dropped a total of 445 tons of bombs in and around Duisburg. As part of the Battle of the Ruhr, another British raid of 577 bombers destroyed the old city between 12 and 13 May 1943 with 1,599 tons of bombs. During the bombing raids, 96,000 people were made homeless with countless lives lost.

In 1944 the city was again badly damaged as a total of 2,000 tons of bombs were dropped on 22 May. On 14 October, the tonnage was repeated with 2,018 tons when Halifax, Lancaster, and Mosquito bombers appeared over Duisburg as part of Operation Hurricane. This daylight raid was followed by a night attack; over 24 hours about 9,000 tons of HE and incendiaries had been dropped on Duisburg. Numerous similar attacks followed until the end of 1944.

The Allied ground advance into Germany reached Duisburg in April 1945. The US 17th Airborne Division, acting as regular infantry and not in a parachute role, met only scattered resistance in the vicinity and captured the city on 12 April 1945.

On 8 May 1945 the ADSEC Engineer Group A, led by Col. Helmer Swenholt, commanding officer of the 332nd Engineer General Service Regiment, constructed a railway bridge between Duisburg and Rheinhausen across the Rhine. It was 860 meters long, and constructed in six days, fifteen hours and twenty minutes, a record time. It was named the "Victory Bridge".

Post-World War II period 

A total of 299 bombing raids had almost completely destroyed the historic cityscape. 80% of all residential buildings had been destroyed or partly damaged. Almost the whole of the city had to be rebuilt, and most historic landmarks had been lost.

Beginning in the mid-1960s, the decline of Duisburg's steel and mining industry caused a significant loss of residents. While in 1975 approximately 590,000 people were living in Duisburg, the number had shrunk to 518,000 in 1985.

Duisburg celebrated its 1100th anniversary in 1983. The city's population recovered a little in the following years, up to 537,000 in 1992. It declined to 488,000 in 2011. On 19 July 2004, it was hit by a tornado. The municipal theater and parts of the city center were damaged. The city hosted the 7th World Games in 2005. In 2010, 21 people died because of a mass panic at the Love Parade; over 500 people were injured.

Demographics
In 2010, Duisburg had a population of 489,600, a slight decrease since 2006.

Population structure of non-German residents:

Turkish community 
Duisburg is home to 85,000 people of Turkish origin. Other estimates suggest that the Turkish population is as large as 100,000. The new Merkez Mosque, one of the largest Muslim places of worship in Western Europe, was built with help by the way of contribution of 3.2 million euro from the EU and the state of North Rhine-Westphalia. Asiye Nur Fettahoğlu, a Turkish-German actress, was born in Duisburg on 12 November 1980.

Transport

Duisburg Port 
Duisburg-Ruhrorter Häfen is the largest inland port in the world. It is officially regarded as a "seaport" because seagoing river vessels go to ports in Europe, Africa and the Middle East. Numerous docks are mostly located at the mouth of the Ruhr where it joins the Rhine.

Each year more than 40 million tonnes of various goods are handled with more than 20,000 ships calling at the port. With 2.5 million TEU it is also the largest inland container port, based on 2011 figures. A number of companies run their own private docks and 114 million tonnes of goods yearly (2010) are handled in Duisburg in total.

Roads 
Duisburg is served by several autobahns, with 3 east–west routes and 2 north–south routes. A3 forms a bypass east of the city and mostly serves through traffic. A59 runs parallel to A3 and serves the city from north to south with 14 interchanges, much more than most other cities in the Ruhr area. The A40 and A42 are two east–west routes that serve central and northern Duisburg. Autobahn A40 also serves major through traffic from the Netherlands to Berlin and points east. A short spur, A524 serves southern Duisburg. Most Autobahns have six lanes or are upgraded to six lanes (A59).

Apart from the autobahns, no Bundesstraßen serve the city directly. B8 runs through the city, but uses A59's alignment. B288 runs in the extreme south of the city, and serves traffic to and from Krefeld. Several bridges span the Rhine, most prominently the A40 and A42 bridges, but also the L287 suspension bridge and the L237 arch bridge, a three-lane bridge with 2 lanes per peak direction with dynamic lane usage.

Public transport 
Duisburg Hauptbahnhof is served by the InterCityExpress and InterCity long-distance network of the Deutsche Bahn, in addition line  of the S-Bahn line connects Duisburg with other cities of the Rhine-Ruhr area.

The Duisburg Stadtbahn, the Duisburg tramway network, and a bus system, all operated by the Duisburger Verkehrsgesellschaft, provide local services. Stadtbahn line U79, the so-called "D-Bahn" ("D-Line"), connects to the neighbouring city of Düsseldorf and is operated jointly with the Rheinbahn of Düsseldorf. All S-Bahn, Stadtbahn, and bus lines operate under the umbrella of the Verkehrsverbund Rhein-Ruhr.

Media 
There are several newspapers reporting on local events and politics, including the Westdeutsche Allgemeine (WAZ), the Neue Ruhr Zeitung (NRZ) and the Rheinische Post (RP). The local radio station "Radio Duisburg" was the first local radio broadcaster in the German state of North Rhine-Westphalia. It started broadcasting in 1990.
There is a local television station ("STUDIO 47"), which was the first local station to broadcast in North Rhine-Westphalia. It started broadcasting in 2006. In its Duisburg studios the WDR produces a local programme for the city of Duisburg and the Lower Rhine region north of Düsseldorf. WDR is part of the German television and radio network ARD.

Culture 
Duisburg hosts a comprehensive range of cultural facilities and events. A highlight is the annual "Duisburger Akzente", a festival focusing on modern social, political and cultural topics.

Besides Düsseldorf Duisburg is a residence of the Deutsche Oper am Rhein, one of the major opera houses in Germany. The Duisburg Philharmonic Orchestra is one of Germany's orchestras with an international reputation.

Due to its history as a harbour city and a trade and industrial center, Duisburg offers a variety of architectural places of interest, such as the German Inland Waterways Museum. Buildings vary from old churches such as "St Johann Baptist" in Duisburg-Hamborn, which was built in 900, to modern age buildings such as Micro-Electronic-Centrum in Duisburg-Neudorf, built in 1995. Another subject of interest is the Landschaftspark Duisburg-Nord an abandoned industrial complex open to the public and an Anchor Point of ERIH, The European Route of Industrial Heritage. The city center contains the Wilhelm Lehmbruck Museum, the municipal theatre and the shopping street known as "fountain mile".

The city also contains two botanical gardens, the Botanischer Garten Duisburg-Hamborn and the Botanischer Garten Kaiserberg, as well as a number of municipal parks.

On 24 July 2010, 21 people were killed and hundreds injured in the city during the Love Parade disaster. The Love Parade was an electronic dance music festival and technoparade.

Sport 

Duisburg is involved in many kinds of sports. Nevertheless, most important for its inhabitants is the local football club MSV Duisburg. Recently, with the new MSV Arena the city received a brand new sports stadium for various kinds of sports such as football and American football. During the summer months of 2005 the World Games took place in Duisburg. During the 2006 FIFA World Cup, Duisburg was the stage for preparation of the Portuguese team and the residence of the Italian football team, who won the cup in the final match against France. Duisburg is also known for its Rhein-Ruhr-Marathon, its rowing and canoeing regattas and the world championships that take place there regularly. Other popular sports are ice hockey, baseball, American football, water polo, and field hockey.

Notable people
Gerardus Mercator (1512–1594), Flemish cartographer, inventor of the Mercator projection
Ludwig Susen (1807–1863), elementary teacher
Wilhelm Lehmbruck (1881–1919), sculptor
August Thyssen (1842–1926), industrialist
Oswald Pohl (1892–1951), Nazi SS officer executed for war crimes
Paul Bäumer (1896–1927), World War I flying ace
Ferdinand Simoneit (1925–2010), journalist and author
Lüder Lüers (1926–2022), German horticultural architect, engaged in founding Kindernothilfe
Dieter Kürten (born 1935), sports journalist
Daisy Door (born 1944), Schlager music singer
Hans-Werner Gessmann (born 1950), psychologist
Ronny van Dyke (born Jörg T. Hartmann in 1956), singer and songwriter
Frank Peter Zimmermann (born 1965), violinist
Christoph Reuter (born 1968), musicologist
Christian Ehring (born 1972), comedian
Stefan Gertler (born 1972), singer
Ramin Djawadi (born 1974), German-Iranian composer and music producer
Nur Fettahoğlu (born 1980), Turkish-German actress
André Lotterer (born 1981), Belgian-German racing driver
Lance David Arnold (born 1986), racing driver
Benjamin Leuchter (born 1987), racing driver
Jacob Goll (born 1992), ice hockey player

Twin towns – sister cities

Duisburg is twinned with:

 Portsmouth, England, UK (1950)
 Calais, France (1964)
 Wuhan, China (1982)
 Vilnius, Lithuania (1985)
 Gaziantep, Turkey (2005)
 Perm, Russia (2007)
 San Pedro Sula, Honduras (2008)
 Lomé, Togo (2010)
 Fort Lauderdale, United States (2011)
 Kryvyi Rih, Ukraine (2023)

References

Bibliography

External links 

  
Gemeindeblatt der Jüdischen Gemeinde Duisburg (1928–1932) is a digitized periodical at the Leo Baeck Institute, New York

 
World War II strategic bombing
Cities in North Rhine-Westphalia
Populated places on the Rhine
Port cities and towns in Germany
Members of the Hanseatic League
Free imperial cities
Districts of the Rhine Province